Lazar Mitrović (27 May 1993) is a Serbian football midfielder.

Career

Red Star Belgrade
Born in Smederevska Palanka, Mitrović passed Red Star Belgrade youth categories and later was loaned to Sopot, between 2011 and 2013. In summer 2013, Mitrović signed his first four-year professional contract with Red Star, but he missed the whole 2013–14 season because of injury. After recovering he was loaned to Sopot again, for a season. He signed a contract termination and left the club in 2016.

BSK Borča
For the rest of the 2015–16 season, Mitrović joined BSK Borča. During the spring half of the season, Mitrović made 3 appearances, against Bežanija, Napredak Kruševac, and Sloboda Užice in the last fixture of the competition.

Career statistics

References

1993 births
Living people
People from Smederevska Palanka
Association football midfielders
Red Star Belgrade footballers
FK Sopot players
FK BSK Borča players
Serbian First League players
Serbian footballers